Molopidius spinicollis is a species of beetle in the family Carabidae, the only species in the genus Molopidius.

References

Pterostichinae